Kalburabastı (sometimes spelled kalbura bastı) or kalburabasma (Turkish, also known as hurmašice or urmašice in Bosnia and Herzegovina, Serbia
and all of former Yugoslavia), and sometimes also known under the name of hurma, are syrup-drenched pastries that have a riddled appearance. They are featured among the favorite specialities that are prepared during the Islamic holidays, including the three-day Eid al-Fitr (called Şeker Bayramı or "Candy Feast" in Turkish language) and Eid al-Adha.

This Ottoman Turkish treat has a very similar variation of it ("hurmašice", "urmašice" or "hurme") which can be found in Bosnia and Herzegovina, Serbia and other parts of former Yugoslavia.

See also
Melomakarono
Şekerpare
Revani
Baklava
Tulumba
Loukoumades
Phoenicia dessert
 List of pastries

References

Bosnia and Herzegovina cuisine
Middle Eastern cuisine
Turkish pastries
Turkish desserts
Turkish words and phrases